WYEL (600 AM) is a radio station broadcasting a Spanish language talk radio format, repeating San Juan station WKAQ AM. It is licensed to Mayagüez, Puerto Rico, and is owned by Uforia Audio Network.

References

External links
Official website

News and talk radio stations in Puerto Rico
Univision Radio Network stations
Radio stations established in 1948
YEL
1948 establishments in Puerto Rico